Excessive force may refer to:

 A form of police brutality
 Excessive Force (film), a 1993 American action film
 Excessive Force, a musical project started by Sascha Konietzko

See also 
 Proportionality (law)